Dederang is a town in north east Victoria.  The town is located on the Kiewa Valley Highway, in the Alpine Shire Local government in Australia, 329 kilometres from the state capital, Melbourne.  Dederang is located in the Kiewa River valley.  At the 2006 census, Dederang and the surrounding area had a population of 422.

Dederang Post Office opened on 1 September 1877 and closed in 1977.

The town is a popular trout fishing centre and holds a New Year's Day race meeting.

The town in conjunction with neighbouring township Mount Beauty has an Australian Rules football team Dederang-Mount Beauty competing in the Tallangatta & District Football League.

Dederang has a picnic horse racing club, the Dederang Picnic Race Club, which holds its one race meeting a year with the Dederang Cup in January.

Golfers play at the Dederang Golf Club on the Kiewa Valley Highway.

Other notable clubs are the Dederang Bowls Club  and the Dederang & District Trail Riding Club.

References

Towns in Victoria (Australia)
Alpine Shire